Mermaid Madness is an action-adventure game developed by Soft Design and published by Electric Dreams Software for the Amstrad CPC, Commodore 64, and ZX Spectrum in 1986.

Gameplay

The player takes on the role of a 112 year old mermaid called Myrtle. Myrtle is on a quest to rescue Gordon, a deep sea diver who she has taken a romantic interest in. As Gordon has become trapped in a small cave, Myrtle must find a way to free him before his air runs out. As she travels around the sea bed Myrtle can collect and use a variety of objects. She must also avoid fish and other creatures which can sap her energy. However, energy can be replenished by picking up bottles of stout.

Reception
Mermaid Madness received mostly positive reviews, including scores of 70% from Amstrad Action, 37/40 from ASM, 7/10 from Commodore User, 27/40 from Computer & Video Games, 15/20 from Computer Gamer, 66% from Crash, and 78% from Zzap!64. However, it also received some negative reviews such as 46% from Happy Computer and only one star out of five from Sinclair User.

References

External links

Mermaid Madness at World of Spectrum

1986 video games
Action-adventure games
Amstrad CPC games
Commodore 64 games
Fiction about mermaids
Puzzle video games
Single-player video games
Video games developed in the United Kingdom
Video games featuring female protagonists
Video games scored by Fred Gray
Video games with underwater settings
ZX Spectrum games